Baekje Military Museum is a public museum in Nonsan, South Korea elucidating the military history of the later Baekje kingdom.  The museum includes artifacts, reconstructed weapons and armor, dioramas, and a reconstructed defense wall.  It opened in 2002.
  
Opening hours are between 09:00 to 18:00 except on Mondays and the Chuseok and Lunar New Year holidays. The museum is administered by Nonsan's city government. It is located just north of Tapjeong Reservoir, off highway 4 / 1.

References
*백ㅈㅔ 국 사박물관 Nonsan. (museum brochure)

External links
Official home-page

Museums in South Chungcheong Province
Museums established in 2002
Military and war museums in South Korea
Nonsan
2002 establishments in South Korea